Richmond Township is an inactive township in Ray County, in the U.S. state of Missouri. It is part of the Kansas City metropolitan area.

History
Richmond Township was founded in 1829, taking its name from the town of Richmond, Missouri.

References

Townships in Ray County, Missouri
Townships in Missouri